Rho  (uppercase Ρ, lowercase ρ or ;  or ) is the 17th letter of the Greek alphabet. In the system of Greek numerals it has a value of 100. It is derived from Phoenician letter res . Its uppercase form uses the same glyph, Ρ, as the distinct Latin letter P; the two letters have different Unicode encodings.

Uses

Greek
Rho is classed as a liquid consonant (together with Lambda and sometimes the nasals Mu and Nu), which has important implications for morphology. In both Ancient and Modern Greek, it represents a alveolar trill , alveolar tap , or alveolar approximant .

In polytonic orthography, a rho at the beginning of a word is written with a rough breathing, equivalent to h ( rh), and a double rho within a word is written with a smooth breathing over the first rho and a rough breathing over the second ( rrh). That apparently reflected an aspirated or voiceless pronunciation in Ancient Greek, which led to the various Greek-derived English words starting with rh or containing rrh.

Other alphabets
Letters that arose from rho include Roman R and Cyrillic Er (Р).

Mathematics and science 
In the physical sciences to represent:
Densities: mass density, air density or charge density (ρ)
Resistivity (ρ)
Rho meson (ρ+, ρ−, ρ0)
General quantum states
Hammett Equation, ρ is used to represent the reaction constant, this is independent of the position and nature of the substituents of the benzene ring.
In mathematics to represent:
A length coordinate in polar, cylindrical, spherical,  and toroidal coordinate systems, and toroidal and poloidal coordinates of the Earth's magnetic field.
The correlation coefficient of a population parameter
The spectral radius of a matrix  denoted as 
The plastic number
The prime constant
The sensitivity to interest rates of a pricing function
The expected return of a given policy in reinforcement learning, denoted 
In economics to represent the discount rate of future pence cash flows
In molecular biology to represent the Rho protein responsible for termination of RNA synthesis.
In molecular biology to represent the Rho family of GTPases, important for cytoskeletal dynamic regulation.
In ecology to represent the population damping ratio where ρ = λ1 / |λ2|.
In computer programming
The lower-case rho "⍴" means reshape in the APL programming language, and by extension also queries shape
The lower-case rho "ρ" is used for the unary rename operation in relational algebra
In statistics to represent Spearman's rank correlation coefficient, commonly known as Spearman's rho
In options theory to represent the rate of change of a portfolio with respect to interest rates

Chi Rho
The letter rho overlaid with chi forms the Chi Rho symbol, used to represent Jesus Christ.

Rho with stroke (ϼ)

Character encodings

Greek rho

Greek rho symbols

Coptic ro

Functional symbol

Mathematical rho

These characters are used only as mathematical symbols. Stylized Greek text should be encoded using the normal Greek letters, with markup and formatting to indicate text style.

See also 

Р, р - Er (Cyrillic)
R, r - Latin
P, p - Latin

References 

Greek letters